Bajrayogini is a village and former Village Development Committee that is now part of Shankharapur Municipality in Kathmandu District in Province No. 3 of central Nepal. At the time of the 1991 Nepal census it had a population of 3,798 and had 632 houses in it. As per 2011 Nepal census it had a population of 4,333 and had 328 houses in it.

References

Populated places in Kathmandu District